The Council of Chairpersons is the primary functional body that assists the Chairman in the day-to-day operation of the Standing Committee of the National People's Congress of the People's Republic of China. It is composed of the chairman, the vice-chairpersons, and the secretary-general. It holds more frequent meetings than the Standing Committee.

References 

Members of the Standing Committee of the National People's Congress